François Civil (born 29 January 1990) is a French actor. He has appeared in both French and English-language feature films and is known for his roles in Frank (2014), As Above, So Below (2014), Call My Agent! (2015–17), Five (2016), Burn Out (2017), The Wolf's Call (2019), Someone, Somewhere (2019), Who You Think I Am (2019), Love at Second Sight (2019), and BAC Nord (2021). Civil was twice included in the César Awards Révélations list, in 2009 and 2012 respectively, and received a Trophée Chopard at the 2019 Cannes Film Festival. He has received two nominations for the César Award for Best Supporting Actor.

Filmography

Theatre

Awards and nominations

References

External links

 

1989 births
Living people
21st-century French male actors
French male film actors
French male television actors
French male stage actors
Male actors from Paris
Chopard Trophy for Male Revelation winners